Dendrophilia unicolorella is a moth of the family Gelechiidae. It was described by Ponomarenko in 1993. It is found in Russia (Primorskii krai) and Korea.

The larvae feed on Lespedeza bicolor.

References

unicolorella
Moths described in 1993